Mire Mare is an unreleased video game by Ultimate Play the Game.

Underwurlde, the second game in the Sabreman series of titles from Ultimate (between Sabre Wulf and Knight Lore), has three separate exits, each naming another game in the series.  The first exit names Knight Lore, which was released at the same time as Underwurlde. The second names Pentagram, which surfaced in 1986. The third exit names Mire Mare, which was expected, but never published.<ref>{{citation | url=http://live.worldofspectrum.org/infoseek/magazines/pages/sinclair-user/63/108 | title='Mire Mare "preview" | journal=Sinclair User | issue=63 | pages=108 | publisher=EMAP | date=June 1987 }}</ref>

On completion of Knight Lore, the poem displayed reads:
 THE POTION CASTS
 ITS MAGIC STRONG
 ALL EVIL MUST BEWARE
 THE SPELL HAS BROKEN
 YOU ARE FREE
 GO FORTH TO MIREMARE

And on completion of Pentagram, the message displayed is:
 CONGRATULATIONS
 YOU HAVE COMPLETED
 THE PENTAGRAM
 YOUR ADVENTURE CONTINUES IN
 MIRE MARE

Rare (the company that rose from Ultimate's ashes) revealed in the late 1990s that the game have been similar to the top-down Sabre Wulf''. They also explained that although the basic game design was completed Ultimate's hectic schedule meant that the title's actual coding was never completed.

References

Cancelled ZX Spectrum games
Rare (company) games